The 2006 Oceania Athletics Championships were held at the Apia Park in Apia, Samoa, between December 12–16, 2006.

A total of 38 events were contested, 20 by men, 17 by women, and 1 mixed relay.

Except javelin thrower Victor Dao, athletes from New Caledonia were listed as guests, although they were reported as medal winners on the webpage of the Ligue de Nouvelle Calédonie Athlétisme (resulting in a total 7 medals in the open category, 3 gold, 1 silver, and 1 bronze).

Medal summary
Complete results can be found on the webpages of the Oceania Athletics Association, Athletics PNG, and Athletics Samoa.

Men

Women

Mixed

Medal table (unofficial)

Participation (unofficial)
The participation of athletes from 20 countries could be determined from the published results.

References

Oceania Athletics Championships
Athletics in Samoa
Oceanian Championships
2006 in Samoan sport
International sports competitions hosted by Samoa
December 2006 sports events in Oceania